The Southern Hami–Zhengzhou UHVDC is an ultra high-voltage direct current power transmission line from the north-west to central China.

Background 
It is the first ultra high-voltage project implemented by the Northwest China Grid Company, a subsidiary of the State Grid Corporation of China.  Construction started on 13 May 2012. It went into operation in January 2014.  Expected cost was 23.4 billion yuan.

Design 
The line was designed and built by several different Chinese companies. Converter transformers and components were supplied by ABB Group, by XD Group, and by Siemens AG.

Operation 
The transmission line starts at the Hami Nanhu converter station next to the Dananhu Power Station in Xinjiang and runs through Xinjiang, Gansu, Shaanxi, Ningxia, Shanxi and Henan provinces to Zhengzhou converter station in Henan. The line operates at ±800 kV voltage and is designed to have a transmission capacity of 8,000 MW, the highest in the world.

Coordinates 
 Southern Hami–Zhengzhou UHVDC – Converterstation Hami 
 Southern Hami–Zhengzhou UHVDC – Converterstation Zhengzhou

References

Electric power infrastructure in China
HVDC transmission lines
2014 establishments in China
Energy infrastructure completed in 2014